Robert Harvey or Rob Harvey may refer to:

Sports
Robert Harvey (cricketer) (1911–2000), South African cricketer
Robert Harvey (footballer) (born 1971), Australian rules football coach and former player

Politicians
Robert Harvey (Australian politician) (1897–1968), member of the Tasmanian Parliament
Robert Harvey (Clwyd politician) (born 1953), British historian and Conservative politician, former MP for Clwyd South West (1983–1987)
Sir Robert Harvey, 1st Baronet, of Crown Point (1817–1870), MP Thetford 1865–1868
Sir Robert Harvey, 1st Baronet of Langley Park (1825–1887), MP Buckinghamshire 1863–1868, 1874–1885

Others
R. C. Harvey (Robert C. Harvey, born 1937), author, critic and cartoonist
Rob Harvey (special effects artist), Academy Award-winning special effects artist
Sir Robert Harvey (businessman) (1847–1930), British saltpetre producer in Bolivia, Peru and Chile
Robert Harvey (literary theorist) (born 1951), literary scholar and academic
Robert Harvey (musician) (born 1983), British musician
Robert B. Harvey, co-founder of Harvey Comics

See also
 Bobby Harvey (born 1955), Scottish footballer with Clyde
 Bob Harvey (disambiguation)